Avantgarde History is a CD-R compilation album created by Eberhard Kranemann of his work with artists such as Neu! and Joseph Beuys in the late 1960s and early 1970s. It was released privately and is only available on request.

Bands

Pissoff
Pissoff was a band founded in the late 1960s by Kranemann and some friends. Eberhard had studied under Beuys, and the artist is featured with Pissoff on the first track, recorded in Düsseldorf's Creamcheese club. Shortly after this recording, Florian Schneider joined the band. An unedited version of this track was also released separately by Kranemann.

The Origins of Kraftwerk
This is a retrospectively named ensemble consisting of Schneider and Kranemann, both of whom would go on to play in the band Kraftwerk. The three jams were recorded in 1967. The complete session was released separately by Kranemann.

Neu!
The three tracks featured were recorded live in 1972, shortly after the recording of Neu! '72 Live in Dusseldorf. The first two were recorded at a party, the third at a concert. All three feature the line-up of Klaus Dinger on drums and vocals,  Kranemann on slide guitar, Uli Trepte on bass guitar and Michael Rother on guitar.

Fritz Mueller
After the split-up of Neu! in 1973, Kranemann founded his own project, for which he assumed the pseudonym "Fritz Mueller". An album was originally intended to be released by Dinger's Dingerland record label, but when the label collapsed, the release was shelved. Fritz Mueller Rock was released by Brain Records in 1977. Kranemann has continued the project and several more albums have been released privately.

Track listing

 "Live at the Creamcheese, Düsseldorf, 1968 with Joseph Beuys - Handaktion, and Eberhard Kranemann - Cello, Clarinet, Tenor Saxophone" by Pissoff (21:06)
 "Florian - Flute, Eberhard - Double Bass" by the Origins of Kraftwerk (5:02)
 "Florian - Violin, Eberhard - Cello" by the Origins of Kraftwerk (13:03)
 "Florian - Flute, Eberhard - Tenor Saxophone" by the Origins of Kraftwerk (4:50)
 "Live in Duesseldorf" by Neu!(3:46)
 "Live in Duesseldorf" by Neu! (4:22)
 "Live at Muenster University Hall" by Neu! (16:12)
 "Fritz Mueller Radio" by Fritz Mueller (3:01)

1972 Live
Later in 2009, Kranemann made available a CD-R featuring solely his live recordings of Neu! from 1972. This featured longer versions of the tracks included on the compilation:

 "Live in Duesseldorf @ Party 1972 (Part 1)" (3:45)
 "Live in Duesseldorf @ Party 1972 (Part 2)" (4:22)
 "Live in Duesseldorf @ Party 1972 (Part 3)" (8:41)
 "Live in Muenster, University Hall 1972 (Part 1)" (16:12)
 "Live in Muenster, University Hall 1972 (Part 2)" (12:32)

The CD-R was again released via Kranemann's Kunsthaus Boltenberg label.

2009 compilation albums